Chlorococcales is a formerly recognized order of green algae in the class Chlorophyceae. , the type family Chlorococcaceae was placed in the order Chlamydomonadales.

Conventionally, many groups of coccoid green algae were lumped in the order Chlorococcales sensu lato by Komárek & Fott (1983), based on Pascher's (1918) idea of establishing orders according to life forms. However, coccoid green algae are currently placed in several orders of Chlorophyceae, Trebouxiophyceae, Ulvophyceae (e.g., Chlorocystis) and Prasinophyceae within the division Chlorophyta, or in the division Charophyta (e.g., Chlorokybales, Desmidiales).

Families
According to Komárek & Fott (1983):
 Chlorococcaceae (Chlorococcoideae, Spongiococcoideae)
 Palmellaceae   (Hormotiloideae, Palmelloideae, Neochloridoideae, Chlorosarcinoideae) 
 Chlorochytriaceae 
 Dicranochaetaceae 
 Characiaceae (Fernandinelloideae, Characioideae, Schroederioideae)
 Treubariaceae 
 Golenkiniaceae 
 Hydrodictyaceae 
 Micractiniaceae 
 Botryococcaceae  (Dictyosphaerioideae, Ecballocystoideae, Botryococcoideae)
 Radiococcoideae  (Radiococcoideae, Disporoideae, Dictyochlorelloideae, Palmodictyoideae)
 Oocystaceae (Lagerheimiodeae, Oocystoideae, Eremosphaeroideae, Glaucocystoideae)
 Chlorellaceae (Siderocelidoideae, Chlorelloideae, Ankistrodesmoideae, Tetraedronoideae, Scotielloideae)  
 Coelastraceae
 Scenedesmaceae (Coronastroideae, Danubioideae, Crucigenioideae, Tetrallantoideae, Scenedesmoideae, Dimorphococcoideae)

According to Smith (1938):
Chlorococcaceae
Endosphaeraceae
Characiaceae
Protosiphonaceae
Hydrodictyaceae
Oöcystaceae
Scenedesmaceae

References

Bibliography
 Komarék, J.; Fott, B. 1983. Chlorophyceae (Grünalgen), Ordnung: Chlorococcales, In: Huber-Pestalozzi, G., (Ed), Das Phytoplankton des Susswasers; Systematik und Biologie. Stuttgart, E. Schweizerbart’sche Verlagsbuchhhandlung, Bd 7, fasc. 1, 1044p.

Chlorophyceae
Chlorophyta orders
Historically recognized algae taxa